The Latin turned alpha, also known as the turned script A (uppercase: Ɒ, lowercase: ɒ), is an additional letter of the Latin script, based on letters A and Latin alpha (Ɑ). Its lowercase variant is used in International Phonetic Alphabet, Americanist phonetic notation, Uralic Phonetic Alphabet, Teuthonista, Swedish Dialect Alphabet, Dania, and Norvegia transcriptions. Its uppercase variant is used in the Americanist phonetic notation. The letter also appears in Belter Creole, a constructed language made by Nick Farmer for The Expanse television sci-fi series.

Usage 
In the 1890s, Philipp Lenz used the turned alpha in his phonetic transcription to represent a very short vowel A.

In Uralic Phonetic Alphabet, Swedish Dialect Alphabet, Dania, and Norvegia transcriptions, the lowercase letter is used to represent the near-open central vowel sound. It also appears in Teuthonista transcription.

In the International Phonetic Alphabet, the lowercase letter is used to represent the open back rounded vowel sound, that appears for example in the English word not. Its usage was originally proposed in the 1900s and 1910s and was formally introduced in the 1920s.

It appeared in the 1939 Handbook of the Linguistic Geography of New England, where it was used to represent the open back rounded vowel. It is also sometimes appeared in other works, where it was used in to denote the open back unrounded vowel.

In the Americanist phonetic notation the lowercase letter (ɒ) represents the open back unrounded vowel ([ɑ]), while the uppercase letter (Ɒ) represents open posterior unrounded voice.

The letter is also used in Belter Creole, a constructed language made by Nick Farmer for The Expanse television sci-fi series. It is sometimes used as an alternative variant for the digraph Ow, used to denote the open back rounded vowel ([ɒ]) sound. For example, the alternative spelling of the word owkwa, which means water, would be ɒkwa.

Encodings

See also
Transformation of text

References

Bibliography 
 Philipp Lenz, Der Handschuhsheimer dialekt: Nachtrag zum wörterverzeichnis von 1887, Darmstadt, G. Otto, 1892.
 Manne Eriksson, Svensk ljudskrift 1878–1960: En översikt över det svenska landsmålsalfabetets utveckling och användning huvudsakligen i tidskriften Svenska Landsmål, Stockholm, P. A. Norstedt & Söner, 1961.
 The principles of the International Phonetic Association, Paris, London, International Phonetic Association, 1912.
 Martin Heepe, Lautzeichen und ihre Anwendung in verschiedenen Sprachgebieten, Berlin, Reichsdruckerei, 1928.
 Hans Kurath (director), Marcus L. Hansen, Julia Bloch, Bernard Bloch, Handbook of the Linguistic Geography of New England, 1939.
 William A. Smalley, Manual of Articulatory Phonetics. Revised Edition, Lanham, MD, University Press of America, Inc., 1989.
 Lorna A. Priest, Proposal to encode two phonetic characters and two Shona characters, 2007.
 Luanne von Schneidemesser, Lewis Lawyer, Ken Whistler, Deborah Anderson, Proposal for Two Phonetic Characters (no L2/12-266)

A, Latin turned alpha
Phonetic transcription symbols